Srđan Grahovac (born 19 September 1992) is a Bosnian professional footballer who plays as a defensive midfielder for TFF First League club Çaykur Rizespor.

Grahovac started his professional career at Borac Banja Luka, before joining Rapid Wien in 2014. In 2017, he went on loan to Astana, with whom he signed permanently the following year. Later that year, he was loaned to Rijeka. Grahovac went back to Rapid Wien in 2019. Three years later, he moved to Çaykur Rizespor.

A former youth international for Bosnia and Herzegovina, Grahovac made his senior international debut in 2016, earning 3 caps.

Club career

Early career
Grahovac came through youth academy of his hometown club Borac Banja Luka. He made his professional debut against Laktaši on 1 August 2009 at the age of 16. On 27 February 2011, he scored his first professional goal in a triumph over Široki Brijeg.

Rapid Wien
In June 2014, Grahovac was transferred to Austrian side Rapid Wien for an undisclosed fee. He made his official debut for the team on 31 August against Grödig. On 29 November 2015, he scored his first goal for Rapid Wien in a defeat of Altach.

In June 2016, he extended his contract until June 2019.

Astana
In March 2017, Grahovac was loaned to Kazakh outfit Astana until the end of season. He made his competitive debut for the club against Shakhter Karagandy on 1 April. On 16 April, he scored his first goal for the team in a victory over Okzhetpes.

In February 2018, after signing permanently with Astana, he was sent on a year-long loan to Croatian side Rijeka.

Return to Rapid Wien
In January 2019, Grahovac returned to Rapid Wien on a contract until June 2022. He played his first official game for the team since coming back on 2 March against St. Pölten.

Grahovac played his 100th game for the club against Sturm Graz on 30 May.

On 31 January 2021, he scored his first goal for Rapid Wien after returning against LASK.

Later stage of career
In July 2022, Grahovac moved to Turkish outfit Çaykur Rizespor.

International career
Grahovac represented Bosnia and Herzegovina at all youth levels. He also served as captain of the under-21 team under coach Vlado Jagodić, and is the most capped player in team's history, having appeared in 23 games.

In September 2015, he received his first senior call-up, for UEFA Euro 2016 qualifiers against Wales and Cyprus, but had to wait until 25 March 2016 to make his debut in a friendly game against Luxembourg.

Career statistics

Club

International

Honours
Borac Banja Luka
Bosnian Premier League: 2010–11
Bosnian Cup: 2009–10

Astana
Kazakhstan Premier League: 2017

References

External links

1992 births
Living people
Sportspeople from Banja Luka
Serbs of Bosnia and Herzegovina
Bosnia and Herzegovina footballers
Bosnia and Herzegovina youth international footballers
Bosnia and Herzegovina under-21 international footballers
Bosnia and Herzegovina international footballers
Bosnia and Herzegovina expatriate footballers
Association football midfielders
FK Borac Banja Luka players
SK Rapid Wien players
FC Astana players
HNK Rijeka players
Çaykur Rizespor footballers
Premier League of Bosnia and Herzegovina players
Austrian Football Bundesliga players
Kazakhstan Premier League players
Croatian Football League players
TFF First League players
Expatriate footballers in Austria
Expatriate footballers in Kazakhstan
Expatriate footballers in Croatia
Expatriate footballers in Turkey
Bosnia and Herzegovina expatriate sportspeople in Austria
Bosnia and Herzegovina expatriate sportspeople in Kazakhstan
Bosnia and Herzegovina expatriate sportspeople in Croatia
Bosnia and Herzegovina expatriate sportspeople in Turkey